Radiophron is an extinct genus of wasp which existed in Spain during the early Cretaceous period. The only species is Radiophron ibericus. It is a member of the extinct family Radiophronidae.

References

Ceraphronoidea
Hymenoptera of Europe
Cretaceous insects
Fossil taxa described in 2010
Fossils of Spain